Carnera: The Walking Mountain (also known as Carnera - Il campione più grande)  is a 2008 Italian drama film written and directed by Renzo Martinelli.

It depicts real life events of the boxer Primo Carnera.

Plot

Cast 
 Andrea Iaia as Primo Carnera
Anna Valle as Pina Kovacic
Paolo Seganti as Eudeline
Paul Sorvino as Ledudal
F. Murray Abraham as Léon Sée
Kasia Smutniak as Emilia Tersini
Burt Young as Lou Soresi
Nino Benvenuti as Trainer M. Baer

See also   
 List of Italian films of 2008

References

External links

2008 films
2008 biographical drama films
Italian biographical drama films
Biographical films about sportspeople
Cultural depictions of Italian men
Cultural depictions of boxers
Italian boxing films
Films directed by Renzo Martinelli
2008 drama films
2000s Italian films